The McLaren MP4-21 is a Formula One car that competed in the 2006 Formula One season. It was driven initially by Kimi Raikkonen and Juan Pablo Montoya. After ten races, reserve driver Pedro de la Rosa took over Montoya's race seat.  Gary Paffett was also a test driver for the MP4-21.

Future World Champion Lewis Hamilton drove the MP4-21 in his first official Formula One test in September, 2006 prior to joining McLaren for 2007.

Overview
The MP4-21 was designed by Adrian Newey, Paddy Lowe, Tim Goss, Mike Coughlan and Peter Prodromou. The MP4-21 was the successor to the competitive MP4-20 of the prior season, although significantly different with 90% of the 11,500 components changed from the season prior. In addition, the utilisation of the new V8 specification engines meant that the side air intakes were reduced in size, therefore making aerodynamic benefits. The MP4-21 was the first McLaren car to be powered by purely Mercedes-Benz engines after 11 years partnership with Ilmor as an engine builder.

The MP4-21 was seen on track for the first time in late January 2006 at Barcelona.  It was finished in a historic papaya orange livery.  

In February, the official livery of the MP4-21 was launched in a chrome finish. The teams sponsorship agreement with West had come to an end in 2005, and now Emirates and Johnnie Walker were primary sponsors of the team.

The first race at Bahrain delivered a podium finish for Raikkonen.  Montoya would score podiums at San Marino for third position and Monaco for second, however there were six retirements in the first seven races for the MP4-21. The MP4-21 was regularly outpaced by the Ferrari 248 and the Renault R26. 

Juan Pablo Montoya left the team in order to move to Chip Ganassi Racing NASCAR team after retiring from the 2006 United States Grand Prix.  Pedro de La Rosa took his race seat. de La Rosa would score a career best second place at the 2006 Hungarian Grand Prix driving the MP4-21.

Despite a number of podiums for all three drivers, McLaren did not win a single Grand Prix with the MP4-21. This was the first season since 1996 the team failed to win a race.  Kimi Raikkonen finished in sixth place in the World Drivers' Championship.  McLaren finished third in the World Constructors' Championship with 110 points.

Following the conclusion of the season, former driver and two time World Champion Mika Hakkinen tested the MP4-21 with a view to an F1 return. However, this did not materialise.

After racing
An MP4-21 showcar is displayed at The National Motor Museum in Beaulieu, although now painted in Jenson Button's 2010 livery. Before its closure, MP4-21 chassis 6 was on display at the Donington Grand Prix Collection. An MP4-21 show car is currently for sale via F1 Authentics.

Complete Formula One results
(key) (results in bold indicate pole position; results in italics indicate fastest lap)

References

McLaren MP4 21
2006 Formula One season cars